Homoranthus homoranthoides is a plant in the myrtle family Myrtaceae and is endemic to South Australia.

Description
Homoranthus homoranthoides is a distinctive species recognised by its low growing prostrate habit. A shrub with greyish green linear leaves, small pendulous cream coloured flowers which turn red as they age.

Taxonomy and naming
This species was first formally described in 1853 by Ferdinand von Mueller who gave it the name Schuermannia homoranthoides and published the description in the journal Linnaea. In 1991, Lyndley Craven and S.R.Jones changed the name to Homoranthus homoranthoides. The specific epithet (homoranthoides) refers to the similarity of this species (when named as Schuermannia homoranthoides) to those in the genus Homoranthus. The ending -oides is a Latin suffix meaning "like", "resembling" or "having the form of".

Distribution and habitat
Homoranthus homoranthoides grows in heath and woodland on the southern part of the Eyre Peninsula. Grows on a variety of substrates in mallee heath and woodland.

Conservation status
Moderately restricted distribution although well reserved and often locally common.

References

External links
 The Australasian Virtual Herbarium – Occurrence data for Homoranthus homoranthoides

homoranthoides
Flora of South Australia
Myrtales of Australia
Taxa named by Ferdinand von Mueller
Plants described in 1853